Arthur E. Chadwick is an American orchid grower and entrepreneur. He founded Chadwick & Son Orchids Inc in 1989 with his father, A. A. Chadwick, who has been growing orchids since 1943. Chadwicks has 11 greenhouses in Powhatan County, Virginia and two retail stores in Richmond. The company has been featured in Southern Living magazine, The New York Times, O Magazine, CBS Sunday Morning, and the Washington Post.

With his father, Chadwick co-authored The Classic Cattleyas which is widely considered to be the definitive book on the large-flowered Cattleya species (corsage orchids). Martha Stewart favorably reviewed the book and both Chadwicks appeared on her television show. Chadwick has named Cattleya hybrids after the wives of the last six  U.S. Presidents and has personally presented the flowers to most of the honored recipients.

He has spoken at two World Orchid Conferences - France 2005, Ecuador 2017 and his monthly orchid advice column appeared nationwide in newspapers for 20 years. Chadwick regularly speaks to horticulture groups throughout the United States and, most recently, in England.

Early life

Childhood and family 
Chadwick grew up in Wilmington, Delaware learning about orchids from his father, A. A. Chadwick who nurtured two redwood greenhouses full of rare cattleyas. His mother, Anne, was an amateur watercolor artist and designed the logo for the orchid company.

Education 
Chadwick holds a BS in Electrical Engineering from North Carolina State and a Masters in Business from James Madison. This education was helpful in both the design of the greenhouses and the everyday operation of the company.

Business career

Chadwick & Son Orchids Inc. 
Chadwick and his father founded Chadwick & Son Orchids Inc. (Chadwick Orchids) in 1989 in rural Powhatan County, Virginia. He purchased  of farm land as well as a picturesque log cabin and soon built three commercial redwood greenhouses. 
The first book that the two published was "The Classic Cattleyas," pictured below. A second edition was published a few years later to include many new chapters.

First Ladies and Their Cattleyas 
The Chadwick's are known for their association with the United States First Ladies, many of whom have namesake orchids. The tradition of naming cattleyas after the wives of U.S. Presidents began in 1929 with Mrs. Herbert Hoover and now includes 19 consecutive First Ladies.

Chadwick and his father have named cattleyas after Barbara Bush, Hillary Clinton, Laura Bush, Michelle Obama, Melania Trump, and Jill Biden and presented the flowers to most of the honored recipients. In addition, the Chadwicks have presented to the daughter of Lady Bird Johnson and the granddaughter of Eleanor Roosevelt. Last month, the White House History Quarterly magazine ran a 12-page feature article on the Chadwick's hybrids. The next Chadwick book, "First Ladies and Their Cattleyas: A Century of Namesake Orchids" is due out next spring.

Agritourism 
In recent years, Chadwick's greenhouses have become a destination for agritourism in Powhatan County. Groups of all sizes come to see the orchids and to experience a working tropical plant farm. New additions for 2022 include a 1939 Studebaker at the entrance to the property, a sizable pond along the driveway, garden trains and palm trees by the front door, and a massive barn/event space in the back.

References
Citations

Bibliography
A E Chadwick Biography. Drupal, 2016. Web. 07 Mar. 2016.

Orchidologists
American horticulturists
1962 births
Living people
People from Hockessin, Delaware